Yuga Dharma is one aspect of Dharma, as understood by Hindus. Yuga dharma is that aspect of dharma that is valid for a Yuga, an epoch or age as established by Hindu tradition. The other aspect of dharma is Sanatan Dharma, dharma which is not subject to change.

Hindu sacred writings are broken into two groups: Śruti writings (such as the Vedas) regarded as timeless in character, and Smriti, writings that focus on less timeless elements. Sanatan Dharma is based on the Shruti writings, while Yuga Dharma is based on the Smitris.

Some scholars describe Sanatan dharma as the overall, unchanging and abiding principals of dharma, and describe Yuga dharma as a lesser aspect of dharma, since it is constantly changing. Such scholars distinguish Sanatan dharma as the dharma of religion, and Yuga dharma as the dharma of social interaction: law, ethics, etiquette and so on.

Swami Vivekananda describes the distinction between them in this way. Of Sanatan dharma, he says:
We know that in our books, a clear distinction is made between two sets of truths. The one set is that which abides for ever, being built upon the nature of man, the nature of the soul, the soul's relation to God, the nature of God, perfection and so on; there are also the principles of cosmology, of the infinitude of creation, or more correctly speaking, projection, the wonderful law of cyclical procession, and so on; these are eternal principles founded upon the universal laws of nature. 

Of Yuga dharma, he says:
The other set comprises the minor laws, which guide the working of our everyday life. They belong more properly to the Puranas, to the Smrtis, and not to the Sruti. These have nothing to do with the other principles. Even in India, these minor laws have been changing all the time. Customs of one age, of one yuga, have not been the customs of another, and as yuga come after yuga, they will still have to change.

Opinions 
The current Yuga Dharma for this age is debated amongst the traditions of Hinduism. Within Gaudiya Vaishnavism the belief that the congregational dancing, singing and chanting (japa) of the Hare Krishna maha-mantra is the correct Yuga-dharma, based on quotations from their scriptures:

"This sixteen-name, thirty-two syllable mantra is the Maha-mantra in the Age of Kali by which all living beings can be delivered. One should never abandon chanting this mahamantra."—Ananta-samhita 

For Sri Vaishnavism, the performance of Prappati or Saranagati through the ritual called Panca-Samskaram is the Yuga-dharma, according to the older scriptural text; the Vedas. The ritual initiates one into the protective and saving grace of Vishnu or Narayana. For Sri Vaishnavas, another important part of the yuga-dharma, because of Vedic traditions and scriptural references is the chanting of the eight syllable mantra, two sentence mantra of Narayana and the Vishnu sahasranama or thousand names of Vishnu. These three mantras constitute the original maha-mantras for Vaishnavas during the time of Ramanujacharya and before him. Another aspect of the Yuga-dharma for Sri Vaishnavas, which back by scripture, is surrender and devotion to Sri Venkateshwara or Balaji. According to various verses from the Puranas and other text; Lord Venkateshwara is the supreme form of Vishnu for the Kali Yuga.

ISKCON
In Krishna consciousness it is said that yuga dharma is chanting Holy names of Lord Krishna, chanting Hare Krishna mahamantra. This is teaching of Lord Caitanya - "no other way, only Hari name can save one in Kali Yuga, and bring him back to home, to Godhead" (harer nama eva kaivalam). See: Hare Krishna.

See also 
 Dharma
 Hindu units of measurement
 Taraka Brahma Mantra

References

Hindu philosophical concepts